Joshua Giovanni Pérez Figueroa (born January 21, 1998) is a professional footballer who plays as a forward for Italian  club Montevarchi. Born in the United States, he represents the El Salvador national team.

Club career
On February 4, 2016, Pérez signed with Fiorentina, having trained with the club regularly since 2013. On November 28, 2016, he made his debut against Inter Milan. On August 31, 2017, Fiorentina announced that they would loan Pérez to Serie C club Livorno for the upcoming season.

On August 8, 2018, Pérez returned to the Los Angeles area, signing with Los Angeles FC on a free transfer. Perez and Los Angeles mutually agreed to part ways on February 7, 2020.

On June 25, 2020, Pérez joined Segunda División B side Castellón, but left the club on September 9, as the club was already promoted to Segunda División, without making any appearances. Hours after leaving Castellón, he joined UD Ibiza in the third division.

On July 2, 2021, after helping with seven appearances overall as Ibiza achieved a first-ever promotion to the second division, Pérez reached an agreement with the club to rescind his contract.

On August 26, 2021 Pérez returned to the USL Championship and signed a contract mid-season with Miami FC.

On February 8, 2023, Pérez signed with Montevarchi in the Italian third-tier Serie C.

International career
A longtime USA youth international, Pérez switched allegiance to El Salvador in February 2021, accepting a call-up to the U-23 side ahead of the CONCACAF Men's Olympic Qualifying Championship. He made his debut with the El Salvador U23s in a 2–0 loss to the Canada U23s on 19 March 2021. On 25 March 2021, he scored a brace against the Haiti U23s.

On June 5, 2021, Pérez made his debut with El Salvador senior team in a 7–0 victory against the U.S. Virgin Islands and scored one goal.

Personal life
Joshua Pérez was born in Montebello, California, son of Giovanni Pérez and Susana Figueroa. His father was born in Los Angeles, California to Salvadoran parents, while his mother was born and raised in El Salvador and immigrated to the United States. Giovanni played as a professional soccer player, where he spent time at California Emperors and also played for El Salvador's FAS, a club which Giovanni's father and Joshua's grandfather Hugo Antonio Pérez played. Joshua is the nephew of former professional soccer player and current manager of the El Salvador national team Hugo Pérez.
In 2018 he married Silvia Borghini in Florence

Career statistics

References

External links
Profile at Eurosport
Profile at Top Drawer

1998 births
Sportspeople from Montebello, California
Soccer players from California
American sportspeople of Salvadoran descent
Citizens of El Salvador through descent
Living people
Salvadoran footballers
El Salvador international footballers
El Salvador youth international footballers
American soccer players
United States men's under-23 international soccer players
United States men's under-20 international soccer players
United States men's youth international soccer players
Association football forwards
ACF Fiorentina players
U.S. Livorno 1915 players
Los Angeles FC players
Phoenix Rising FC players
CD Castellón footballers
UD Ibiza players
Miami FC players
Montevarchi Calcio Aquila 1902 players
Serie A players
Serie C players
Major League Soccer players
USL Championship players
Segunda División B players
2021 CONCACAF Gold Cup players
American expatriate soccer players
Salvadoran expatriate footballers
Expatriate footballers in Italy
Salvadoran expatriate sportspeople in Italy
American expatriate sportspeople in Italy
Expatriate footballers in Spain
Salvadoran expatriate sportspeople in Spain
American expatriate sportspeople in Spain